Events from the year 1553 in India.

Events
 Burhan Shah I's death brings to an end his rule of the Ahmednagar Sultanate (started 1508 or 1510)
 Hussein Shah I begins his rule of the Ahmednagar Sultanate

Births

Deaths
 Burhan Shah I, ruler of the Ahmednagar Sultanate (born c. 1500)

See also

 Timeline of Indian history

References

See also
 Timeline of Indian history